Ema Rajić (born 24 February 2000) is a Croatian swimmer. She graduated from University Laboratory High School in 2018. She competed in the women's 50 metre breaststroke at the 2019 World Aquatics Championships and she did not advance to compete in the semi-finals.

In 2019, she was part of the California Golden Bear's NCAA National Champions in the 400 medley relay and Runner-Up National Champions in the 200 yard medley relay held in Austin, Texas. She qualified for and participated in the 100-yard breaststroke NCAA A final, where she placed eighth.

In 2021, she competed in the women's 50 metre freestyle event at the 2020 Summer Olympics held in Tokyo, Japan. She also competed in the women's 100 metre breaststroke event.

References

External links
 

2000 births
Living people
Croatian female swimmers
Place of birth missing (living people)
Female breaststroke swimmers
University Laboratory High School (Urbana, Illinois) alumni
Swimmers at the 2020 Summer Olympics
Olympic swimmers of Croatia
California Golden Bears women's swimmers
21st-century Croatian women